The 1976–77 La Liga was the 46th season since its establishment. It started on September 4, 1976, and finished on May 22, 1977.

Team locations

League table

Results table

Pichichi Trophy

References 
 La Liga 1976/1977
 Primera División 1976/77
 List of La Liga Champions

External links 
  Official LFP Site

La Liga seasons
1976–77 in Spanish football leagues
Spain